Ewing is an unincorporated community in Jackson County, Indiana, in the United States.

History
Ewing was laid out in 1857 by William H. Ewing when it was certain that the railroad would be extended to that point. A post office was established at Ewing in 1857, and remained in operation until it was discontinued in 1967.

References

Unincorporated communities in Jackson County, Indiana
1857 establishments in Indiana
Unincorporated communities in Indiana